The Marinilabiliaceae are a family of bacteria.

Characteristics 
Bacterial cells that belong to the Marinilabiliaceae family are typically thin, flexible rods. Mostly species are motile by gliding motily. They are saccharolytic and need NaCl for growing.

Metabolism 
All species of Marinilabiliaceae are heterotrophic, they do not perform photosynthesis. The genera Alkaliflexus and Anaerophaga as well as some other genera have a strictly fermentative metabolism. Marinilabilia is facultatively anaerobic. It has respiratory and fermentative types of metabolism.

References 

Bacteroidia